Far Away, Down on a Georgia Farm is an album of American musician Norman Blake, released in 1999.

Track listing 
 "New Century Hornpipe" (Traditional) – 2:19
 "Whiskey Deaf and Whiskey Blind" (Norman Blake) – 3:47
 "Far Away, Down on a Georgia Farm" (Blake) – 4:41
 "Goin' Back to the Blue Ridge Mountains" (Alton Delmore) – 4:22
 "Savannah Rag" (Blake) – 5:57
 "Pasquale Taraffo's First Night in Leadville" (Traditional) – 2:44
 "The Winds of Time Won't Change" (Blake) – 4:42
 "Rag Baby Jig" (Traditional) – 3:49
 "Thelma Hatfield" (Blake) – 4:17
 "Constitution March" (Traditional) – 3:15
 "Faded Flowers in Old Love Letters" (Blake) – 5:08
 "And the Cat Came Back the Very Next Day" (Traditional) – 3:09
 "Just Another Faded Love Song" (Blake) – 4:35
 "Give Me Back My Fifteen Cents" (Traditional) – 4:11
 "Snowbird on the Ashbank" (Traditional) – 2:16
 "The Wandering Drummer" (Traditional) – 2:56
 "The Maple on the Hill" (Gussie Davis) – 4:58
 "Headlight Reel" (Traditional) – 2:47

Personnel
Norman Blake – guitar, banjo, dobro, mandolin, vocals

References

1999 albums
Norman Blake (American musician) albums